Honorine Césarine Tian better known by her pseudonym Nori Malo-Renault, was a French etcher, color printmaker. She was born in Marseille, France, on  January 20, 1871, and died at Pau, France, on January 29, 1953.

Biography
Honorine Césarine Tian studied at the Beaux-Arts de Paris, in the studio of Luc-Olivier Merson. In 1897 she married the painter pastellist Émile Auguste Renault (1870-1938), known as Malo-Renault. 

She helps her husband with the printing of his illustrations, in particular for Le Serpent Noir de Paul Adam .Under the name of Nori Malo-Renault, she exhibited at the Salon des Artistes Français from 1897 and some Binding Decorate, then at the  salon de la Société nationale des beaux-arts from 1902 to 1912.

Works 
Nori Malo-Renault produced etchings in color, sometime adding drypoint and aquatinte, for example for the print of La Femme au masque after a pastel by Edmond Aman-Jean whose five plates of copper  (one by color) are kept in Paris at the Chalcographie du Louvre.

The original print Salomé, color etching, are also kept (three matrix of copper)  at the Chalcographie du Louvre.

Some of his prints, mainly in color etchings, are kept in Paris in the prints and photography department of the Bibliothèque nationale de France.

Works in public collections 

  London
 British Museum,  Printed in full color of a print of her husband : little girl lying in bed, holding four dolls in her arms,
  Paris
  Bibliothèque nationale de France, The Black Serpent by Paul Adam, ill. Malo-Renault and  print on color by Nori Malo-Renault
 Manufacture de Sèvres : Bonbonnière,  décors à Sèvres entre 1920-1921
 Chalcography of the Louvre 
    Salomé, original print (3 coper plates)
   La femme au masque (5 coper plates)
   Quimper,
 Musée des Beaux-Arts de Quimper
 Marie-Annick original etching
 Musée départemental Breton
 Exlibris de Charles Le Goffic
 décors à Sèvres entre 1920-1921décors à Sèvres entre 1920-1921
 Rennes
 Musée de Bretagne:
 Les Petits dormeurs, Au dos, inscription avec tampon encreur: imprimé par Nori Malo Renault
 Salomé, eau-forte originale

Prints 

 La Femme au Masque, after Edmond Aman-Jean, etching, drypoint and aquatint in color
 Marie-Annick,original  etching in color
 Le Petit café, etching in color 440 × 300 mm.
 Portrait of William Ewart Gladston, Prime Minister of the United Kingdom, monochrome etching after a lithography by John McLure Hamilton.
 Portrait of Fanny Charrin, after a miniature by Augustin, etching in color.
 Breakfast or Little Girl and Japanese Doll, original etching in color,

Book covers

Embroideries

References 
British Museum
Bibliothèque nationale de France:data:  Notes from the Print and Photography Department of the National Library on Nori Malo-Renault
Chalcographie du Louvre, inventory of engraved copper

 « Nori Malo-Renault », in:  Bénézit Dictionary of Artists on line Oxford Index

French etchers
Color engravers
French women printmakers
20th-century French engravers
19th-century French engravers
1871 births
1953 deaths